Ferocactus fordii (ford barrel cactus) is a species of flowering plant in the family Cactaceae, native to Baja California in Mexico.

In cultivation it requires the protection of glass.

References

fordii
Cacti of Mexico
Endemic flora of Mexico
Flora of Baja California
Plants described in 1899